Martin Eden is a 1909 novel by Jack London.

Martin Eden may also refer to:

Martin Eden (1914 film), an incomplete silent film based on London's novel
Martin Eden (miniseries), a 1979 Italian miniseries based on the novel
"Martin Eden" (Billie Hughes song), theme song for the miniseries
Martin Eden (2019 film), an Italian film based on the novel
"Martin Eden" (Nekfeu song), 2015
Eluvium (musician), also known as Martin Eden

See also
The Adventures of Martin Eden, a 1942 black-and-white film based on the novel